Dick Todd may refer to:

Dick Todd (American football) (1914–1999), NFL player and coach
Dick Todd (ice hockey), former junior hockey coach
Dick Todd (singer) (1914–1973), Canadian singer

See also
Richard Todd (disambiguation)